= All-Atlantic Coast Conference =

All-Atlantic Coast Conference may refer to:

- List of All-Atlantic Coast Conference football teams
- List of All-Atlantic Coast Conference men's basketball teams

== See also ==
- Atlantic Coast Conference
